Thung Tako is a district (amphoe) in the central part of Chumphon province, southern Thailand.

Geography
Neighboring districts are (from the south clockwise) Lang Suan and Sawi of Chumphon Province. To the east is the Gulf of Thailand.

History
The minor districts (king amphoe) was created on 6 September 1976, when then three tambons Thung Takhrai, Tako, and Pak Tako were split off from Sawi district. It was upgraded to a full district on 19 July 1991.

Administration
The district is divided into four sub-districts (tambons), which are further subdivided into 35 villages (mubans). Pak Tako is a sub-district municipality (thesaban tambon) which covers the tambon of the same name. There are a further three tambon administrative organizations (TAO).

References

External links
amphoe.com

Districts of Chumphon province